Virgil "The Conqueror" Kalakoda (born 24 December 1979) is a South African welterweight boxer and kickboxer, fighting out of Full Body Impact Gym in Sydney, Australia. He is former light-middleweight boxing champion and competed in K-1 MAX.

Early career 

Virgil grew up in Cape Town, South Africa. His dad Steve Kalakoda was a boxer and he used to go to the gym with him, and learnt by watching, since he was about 4 years old. Growing up around the likes of Mike Bernardo when he was in his K-1 prime was a huge influence to him.

He had 10 amateur boxing fights, with only one loss to Ruben Groenewald in the final of the national tryouts.

Professional boxing career 

Virgil turned pro in 1996 at 18 years of age defeating Patrick Ngqoba by TKO on his debut in Cape Town.  He went undefeated for his first seven professional bouts before suffering his first loss to Pascal Mtungu in 1997.  In 2000 Virgil had his first professional title fight losing to Joseph Makaringe by tenth round TKO for the South African welterweight title.  Virgil responded well to this setback winning his next thirteen fights between 2000 and 2003 and picked up the International Boxing Council (IBC) light middleweight world title and I.B.F. and W.B.N. intercontinental light middleweight titles.  He suffered his first defeat in four years when he lost via split decision to fellow South African William Gare in a non-title fight in Cape Town.  After a win against Wahab Adebisi he decided to move into the world of kickboxing.

K-1 MAX 

Virgil made his K-1 MAX debut on 4 May 2005 at the K-1 World MAX 2005 World Tournament Open against former champion Albert Kraus with the prize being a place at the quarter final stage of the 2005 K-1 MAX final.  Virgil was unable to defeat the 2002 champion but impressed enough to be offered a super fight at the final event. After racking up a couple of wins with the promotion he was invited back the following year to take place in qualifying only to lose to the 2004 champion Buakaw Por. Pramuk. Once again Virgil impressed in the split decision extension round defeat and was invited to take part in the quarter finals despite the loss.  At the final he met Andy Souwer in the quarter finals and suffered his first stoppage defeat.

Later that year Virgil made his first (and so far only) appearance in Shoot boxing's number one event – the S-Cup.  He met fellow boxer Daniel Dawson in the quarter final stage but was unable to proceed losing by unanimous decision.  Despite early initial promise with the K-1 organization Virgil's record has been patchy – mixing good wins against the likes of Takayuki Kohiruimaki and Ole Laursen with a number of defeats including a shock loss against Se Ki Kim at the K-1 Fighting Network Khan in 2007.

Titles 

 2002-03 W.B.N. light middleweight Inter-continental champion (2 title defences)
 2002 I.B.F. light middleweight Inter-Continental champion
 2001 IBC light middleweight world champion

Kickboxing record 

|-
|-  bgcolor="#FFBBBB"
| 2010-06-06 || Loss ||align=left| Hiroki Shishido || Shoot Boxing 25th Anniversary - Ishin 3rd Battle || Tokyo, Japan || KO (Straight Left) || 3 || 2:15 || 10-10
|-
|-  bgcolor="#CCFFCC"
| 2009-11-27 || Win ||align=left| Jae Gil Noh || The Khan 2 || Seoul, South Korea || Ext.R Decision (Unanimous) || 4 || 3:00 || 10-9
|-
|-  bgcolor="#FFBBBB"
| 2009-11-20 || Loss ||align=left| Ali Gunyar || War of the Worlds || Melbourne, Australia || Decision (Unanimous) || 3 || 3:00 || 9-9
|-
|-  bgcolor="#CCFFCC"
| 2009-08-08 || Win ||align=left| Kozo Mitsuyama || Xplosion Super Fight 19 || Gold Coast, Australia || Ext.R KO (Punch) || 4 || || 9-8 
|-
|-  bgcolor="#FFBBBB"
| 2008-10-01 || Loss ||align=left| Nieky Holzken || K-1 World MAX 2008 Final, Opening Fight || Tokyo, Japan || KO (Right Hook) || 1 || 1:42 || 8-8
|-
|-  bgcolor="#CCFFCC"
| 2008-05-31 || Win ||align=left| Ole Laursen || K-1 Scandinavia MAX 2008, Super Fight || Stockholm, Sweden || Ext.R Decision (Unanimous) || 4 || 3:00 || 8-7
|-
|-  bgcolor="#FFBBBB"
| 2008-04-09 || Loss ||align=left| Masato || K-1 World MAX 2008 Final 16 || Hiroshima, Japan || KO (Right Hook) || 3 || 0:22 || 7-7
|-
! style=background:white colspan=9 |
|-
|-  bgcolor="#CCFFCC"
| 2008-02-24 || Win ||align=left| Se Ki Kim || K-1 Asia MAX 2008, Super Fight || Seoul, South Korea || Ext.R Decision (Split) || 4 || 3:00 || 7-6 
|-
|-  bgcolor="#CCFFCC"
| 2007-10-03 || Win ||align=left| Takayuki Kohiruimaki || K-1 World MAX 2007 Final, Reserve Fight || Tokyo, Japan || TKO (Referee Stoppage) || 3 || 1:56 || 6-6
|-
|-  bgcolor="#FFBBBB"
| 2007-07-21 || Loss ||align=left| Se Ki Kim || K-1 Fighting Network KHAN 2007 || Seoul, South Korea || KO || 2 || 1:48 || 5-6
|-
|-  bgcolor="#FFBBBB"
| 2007-06-28 || Loss ||align=left| Albert Kraus || K-1 World MAX 2007 Final Elimination || Tokyo, Japan || Decision (Unanimous) || 3 || 3:00 || 5-5
|-
! style=background:white colspan=9 |
|-
|-  bgcolor="#CCFFCC"
| 2007-04-04 || Win ||align=left| Hiroyuki Maeda || K-1 MAX 2007 World Elite Showcase || Yokohama, Japan || Decision (Unanimous) || 3 || 3:00 || 5-4
|-
|-  bgcolor="#FFBBBB"
| 2006-11-03 || Loss ||align=left| Daniel Dawson || S-Cup 2006, Quarter Finals || Tokyo, Japan || Decision (Unanimous) || 3 || 3:00 || 4-4
|-
|-  bgcolor="#CCFFCC"
| 2006-09-16 || Win ||align=left| Chi Bin Lim || K-1 KHAN 2006 Seoul || Seoul, South Korea || Ext.R Decision (Majority) || 4 || 3:00 || 4-3
|-
|-  bgcolor="#CCFFCC"
| 2006-09-04 || Win ||align=left| Hiroyuki Maeda || K-1 World MAX 2006 Champions Challenge || Tokyo, Japan || TKO (Doc Stop/Cut) || 2 || 0:33 || 3-3
|-
|-  bgcolor="#FFBBBB"
| 2006-06-30 || Loss ||align=left| Andy Souwer || K-1 World MAX 2006 Final, Quarter Finals || Yokohama, Japan || TKO (Ref Stop/3 Knockdowns) || 3 || 2:23 || 2-3
|-
|-  bgcolor="#FFBBBB"
| 2006-04-05 || Loss ||align=left| Buakaw Por.Pramuk || K-1 World MAX 2006 Open || Tokyo, Japan || Ext.R Decision (Split) || 4 || 3:00 || 2-2
|-
! style=background:white colspan=9 |
|-
|-  bgcolor="#CCFFCC"
| 2006-02-25 || Win ||align=left| Sinbi Taewoong || K-1 KHAN 2006 Busan, Super Fight || Busan, South Korea || Ext.R Decision (Split) || 4 || 3:00 || 2-1
|-
|-  bgcolor="#CCFFCC"
| 2005-07-20 || Win ||align=left| Yoshihiro Sato || K-1 World MAX 2005 Final, Super Fight || Yokohama, Japan || Decision (Majority) || 3 || 3:00 || 1-1
|-
|-  bgcolor="#FFBBBB"
| 2005-05-04 || Loss ||align=left| Albert Kraus || K-1 World MAX 2005 Open || Tokyo, Japan || Decision (Unanimous) || 3 || 3:00 || 0-1
|-
! style=background:white colspan=9 |
|-
|-
| colspan=9 | Legend:

Boxing record 

|-  bgcolor="#FFBBBB"
| 2012-12-09 || Loss ||align=left| Yao Yi Ma || Olympic Park Sports Centre || Homebush, Australia || TKO || 8(12) || 1:42 || 25-8-3
|-
! style=background:white colspan=9 |
|-  bgcolor="#FFBBBB"
| 2011-12-09 || Loss ||align=left| Daniel Dawson || WA Italian Club || Perth, Australia || Decision (Majority) || 12(12) || 3:00 || 25-7-3
|-
! style=background:white colspan=9 |
|-  bgcolor="#c5d2ea"
| 2011-07-23 || Draw ||align=left| Daniel Dawson || WA Italian Club || Perth, Australia || Decision (Split) || 12(12) || 3:00 || 25-6-3
|-
! style=background:white colspan=9 |
|-
|-  bgcolor="#c5d2ea"
| 2011-04-29 || Draw ||align=left| John Akauola || Roundhouse || Kensington, New South Wales, Australia || Decision (Majority) || 6(6) || 3:00 || 25-6-2
|-
|-  bgcolor="#FFBBBB"
| 2011-03-25 || Loss ||align=left| Leroy Brown || Cronulla Sutherland Leagues Club || Cronulla, New South Wales, Australia || Decision (Unanimous) || 6(6) || 3:00 || 25-6-1
|-
|-  bgcolor="#FFBBBB"
| 2009-10-30 || Loss ||align=left| King Davidson || Roundhouse || Sydney, Australia || Decision (Unanimous) || 12(12) || 3:00 || 25-5-1
|-
! style=background:white colspan=9 |
|-
|-  bgcolor="#CCFFCC"
| 2004-04-10 || Win ||align=left| Wahab Adebisi || U.J. Esuene Stadium || Calabar, Nigeria || KO || 2(10) || || 25-4-1
|-
|-  bgcolor="#FFBBBB"
| 2004-01-27 || Loss ||align=left| William Gare || Ratanga Junction || Cape Town, South Africa || Decision (Split) || 10(10) || 3:00 || 24-4-1
|-
|-  bgcolor="#CCFFCC"
| 2003-09-09 || Win ||align=left| Kai Kauramaki || Club Albena || Varna, Bulgaria || Decision (Unanimous) || 10(10) || 3:00 || 24-3-1
|-
|-  bgcolor="#CCFFCC"
| 2003-06-24 || Win ||align=left| Djemal Mehmedov || Sala Sporturilor Olympia || Ploiești, Romania || KO || 1(10) || || 23-3-1
|-
|-  bgcolor="#CCFFCC"
| 2003-03-04 || Win ||align=left| Elvis Guerrero || Sala Sporturilor || Iaşi, Romania || Decision (Unanimous) || 12(12) || 3:00 || 22-3-1
|-
! style=background:white colspan=9 |
|-
|-  bgcolor="#CCFFCC"
| 2002-12-10 || Win ||align=left| Tomas Kugler || Sala Sporturilor || Constanta, Romania || TKO || 11(12) || || 21-3-1
|-
! style=background:white colspan=9 |
|-
|-  bgcolor="#CCFFCC"
| 2002-10-29 || Win ||align=left| Cristian Zamfir || Wynberg Military Sport Complex || Cape Town, South Africa || KO || 1(8) || || 20-3-1
|-
|-  bgcolor="#CCFFCC"
| 2002-07-09 || Win ||align=left| Stefan Dimitrov || Club Albena || Varna, Bulgaria || Decision (Unanimous) || 12(12) || 3:00 || 19-3-1
|-
! style=background:white colspan=9 |
|-
|-  bgcolor="#CCFFCC"
| 2001-02-27 || Win ||align=left| Dieudonne Takou Kotonang || || Somerset West, South Africa || Decision (Unanimous) || 12(12) || 3:00 || 18-3-1
|-
! style=background:white colspan=9 |
|-
|-  bgcolor="#CCFFCC"
| 2001-09-25 || Win ||align=left| Alex Cabinga || Wynberg Military Sport Complex || Cape Town, South Africa || TKO || 5(6) || || 17-3-1
|-
|-  bgcolor="#CCFFCC"
| 2001-06-08 || Win ||align=left| Cyprian Emeti || Grand West Casino || Cape Town, South Africa || KO || 2(12) || 1:33 || 16-3-1
|-
! style=background:white colspan=9 |
|-
|-  bgcolor="#CCFFCC"
| 2001-02-27 || Win ||align=left| Dieudonne Takou Kotonang || Parow Civic Centre || Cape Town, South Africa || TKO || 2(6) || || 15-3-1
|-
|-  bgcolor="#CCFFCC"
| 2001-01-27 || Win ||align=left| Altoria Horne || The Moon || Tallahassee, Florida, USA || Decision (Unanimous) || 8(8) || 3:00 || 14-3-1
|-
|-  bgcolor="#CCFFCC"
| 2000-09-03 || Win ||align=left| Kholisile Mavatha || Bellville Velodrome || Cape Town, South Africa || TKO || 2(10) || || 13-3-1
|-
|-  bgcolor="#CCFFCC"
| 2000-08-13 || Win ||align=left| Morris Dakada || Wynberg Military Sport Complex || Cape Town, South Africa || KO || 1(10) || || 12-3-1
|-
|-  bgcolor="#FFBBBB"
| 2000-02-20 || Loss ||align=left| Joseph Makaringe || Wembley Indoor Arena || Johannesburg, South Africa || TKO || 8(10) ||  || 11-3-1
|-
! style=background:white colspan=9 |
|-
|-  bgcolor="#CCFFCC"
| 1999-09-24 || Win ||align=left| Robert Wright || Rhydycar Leisure Centre || Merthyr Tydfil, Wales, UK || Decision || 6(6) || 3:00 || 11-2-1
|-
|-  bgcolor="#FFBBBB"
| 1999-04-20 || Loss ||align=left| Zoltan Szili || Carousel Hotel & Casino || Temba, South Africa || KO || 1(8) ||  || 10-2-1
|-
|-  bgcolor="#CCFFCC"
| 1999-02-27 || Win ||align=left| Paul Miles || York Hall || London, England, UK || Decision || 6(6) || 3:00 || 10-1-1
|-
|-  bgcolor="#CCFFCC"
| 1998-11-09 || Win ||align=left| Oupa Ntshangulu || Carousel Hotel & Casino || Temba, South Africa || KO || 1(6) || || 9-1-1
|-
|-  bgcolor="#CCFFCC"
| 1998-07-28 || Win ||align=left| Andile Professor Blom || Carousel Hotel & Casino || Temba, South Africa || KO || 1(6) || || 8-1-1
|-
|-  bgcolor="#CCFFCC"
| 1998-02-21 || Win ||align=left| Andile Professor Blom || Great Centenary Hall || New Brighton, South Africa || TKO || 4(6) || || 7-1-1
|-
|-  bgcolor="#FFBBBB"
| 1997-11-08 || Loss ||align=left| Pascal Mtungu || Village Green || Durban, South Africa || Decision || 4(4) || 3:00 || 6-1-1
|-
|-  bgcolor="#CCFFCC"
| 1997-10-08 || Win ||align=left| Thomas Pisan || Carousel Hotel & Casino || Temba, South Africa || Decision || 4(4) || 3:00 || 6-0-1
|-
|-  bgcolor="#CCFFCC"
| 1997-08-28 || Win ||align=left| Michael Ramabele || || Johannesburg, South Africa || Decision || 4(4) || 3:00 || 5-0-1
|-
|-  bgcolor="#CCFFCC"
| 1997-08-23 || Win ||align=left| Zana Mlenzana || Nasrec Indoor Arena || Johannesburg, South Africa || Decision || 6(6) || 3:00 || 4-0-1
|-
|-  bgcolor="#CCFFCC"
| 1997-06-28 || Win ||align=left| Zana Mlenzana || Nasrec Indoor Arena || Johannesburg, South Africa || TKO || 3(6) || 3:00 || 3-0-1
|-
|-  bgcolor="#c5d2ea"
| 1996-07-21 || Draw ||align=left| Michael Mbasane || Wynberg Military Sports Centre || Cape Town, South Africa || Draw || 4(4) || 3:00 || 2-0-1
|-
|-  bgcolor="#CCFFCC"
| 1996-05-12 || Win ||align=left| Sakhiwo Saxie Kilani ||  || Cape Town, South Africa || TKO || 1(4) || || 2-0
|-
|-  bgcolor="#CCFFCC"
| 1996-03-17 || Win ||align=left| Patrick Ngqoba || 3 Arts Theatre || Cape Town, South Africa || TKO || 1(4) || || 1-0
|-
! style=background:white colspan=9 |
|-
|-
| colspan=9 | Legend:

See also 
List of male kickboxers
List of K-1 Events

References

External links 
K-1 Profile of Virgil Kalakoda

1979 births
Living people
Welterweight boxers
South African male kickboxers
Welterweight kickboxers
Sportspeople from Cape Town
South African expatriates in Australia
South African male boxers